Serene Lee is a road cyclist from Singapore. Before taking up cycling, she played basketball for eight years, captaining the Singaporean national women's youth basketball team and playing for the Singapore women's national basketball team at the 2007 Southeast Asian Games and the 2007 FIBA Asia Championship for Women. She originally took up cycling  due to its low impact nature after sustaining a number of sporting injuries.

She represented her nation in the women's road race event at the 2010 UCI Road World Championships. Lee also competed for Singapore at the 2011 and 2015 Southeast Asian Games. After several narrow misses, in 2018 she became Singaporean national road race champion for the first time.

References

External links
 profile at Procyclingstats.com

Singaporean female cyclists
Living people
Place of birth missing (living people)
Women's basketball players
Singaporean basketball players
1988 births
Singaporean sportspeople of Chinese descent